Dirk Dubbers (short for Dietrich Jochen Dubbers) (born 16 November 1943 in Dresden) is a German physicist.

Biography 
Dubbers studied physics at the universities of Göttingen and Heidelberg, received his doctorate in 1972 in Heidelberg, then worked from 1972 to 1975 at the European neutron source of the Institut Laue–Langevin, Grenoble, France in the field of nuclear condensed matter physics, and habilitated 1978 in Heidelberg. From 1985 to 1990 he was senior scientist at ILL and investigated the role of neutrons in particle physics and cosmology. 1991 followed a professorship at the Technical University of Munich. In 1993 he became full professor for experimental physics at Heidelberg University. From 1998 to 2001 Dirk Dubbers was the director of ILL, from 2001 to 2003 the dean of The Faculty of Physics and Astronomy in Heidelberg, and emeritus since 2011.

Distinctions and awards
1991 Stern-Gerlach Medal of the Deutsche Physikalische Gesellschaft, together with Walter Mampe from ILL.
2012 honorary doctor, Vienna University of Technology.

Publications

References

External links
Prof. Dirk Dubbers - Physikalisches Institut Heidelberg

1943 births
Living people
21st-century German physicists
Heidelberg University alumni
20th-century German physicists
Academic staff of Heidelberg University